John Melville Morrow Jr. (April 27, 1933 – October 21, 2017) was an American football player. He played college football at the University of Michigan from 1953 to 1955 and professional football for the Los Angeles Rams and Cleveland Browns from 1956 to 1966.

Early years
Morrow was born in Port Huron, Michigan, in 1933, attended Ann Arbor High School.

University of Michigan
Morrow enrolled at the University of Michigan in 1952 and played for Bennie Oosterbaan's Michigan Wolverines football teams from 1953 to 1955.  He started four games at center for the 1953 Michigan Wolverines football team and three games at tackle for the 1954 team.  Morrow's younger brother, Gordon Morrow, played at the end position for Michigan from 1955 to 1958.

Professional football
Morrow was selected by the Los Angeles Rams in the 28th round (336th overall pick) of the 1956 NFL Draft. He played three seasons and appeared in 35 games for the Rams, principally as a center, during the 1956, 1958, and 1959 NFL seasons. Morrow next played seven seasons with the Cleveland Browns from 1960 to 1966. He was selected to play in the Pro Bowl in 1961 and 1963 and was the starting center on the 1964 Cleveland Browns team that won the 1964 NFL Championship Game.

References

1933 births
2017 deaths
American football centers
Players of American football from Michigan
Michigan Wolverines football players
Los Angeles Rams players
Cleveland Browns players
Eastern Conference Pro Bowl players
People from Port Huron, Michigan
People from Calumet County, Wisconsin
Players of American football from Ann Arbor, Michigan
Sportspeople from Metro Detroit